The 1940 All-Ireland Senior Football Championship was the 54th staging of Ireland's premier Gaelic football knock-out competition.

Format

Provincial Championships format changes

Leinster Championship format change

A reduced amount of counties in the championship of 1940.

Munster Championship format change

There is normal format of 2 Quarter-finals vs 2 Semi-finals in place.

All Ireland semi-finals system

The All-Ireland Senior Football Championship was run on a provincial basis as usual in rotation of every 3rd year, with the four winners from Connacht, Leinster, Munster and Ulster advancing to the All-Ireland semi-finals.  The draw for these games was as follows:
 Munster V. Ulster
 Connacht V. Leinster

Results

Connacht Senior Football Championship

Leinster Senior Football Championship

Munster Senior Football Championship

Ulster Senior Football Championship

All-Ireland Senior Football Championship

Championship statistics

Miscellaneous

 Meath retain the Leinster title for the first time in history.
 The All Ireland semi-final between Galway and Meath was their first championship meeting. 
 Kerry are now level with Dublin for the most All Ireland titles.

References

All-Ireland Senior Football Championship